Clubul Sportiv Aerostar Bacău, commonly known as Aerostar Bacău or simply as Aerostar, is a Romanian professional football club from the city of Bacău, Bacău County, currently playing in the Liga III.

Founded in 1977 as Aripile Bacău, "the yellow and blues" are known as the team of the city's aeronautical manufacturing company. After the fall of communism, the country has undergone a series administrative changes, and in the early 1990s the company changed its name to Aerostar, a name which was also adopted by the football club. During the 1993–94 season, the club encountered serious financial problems that led to the exclusion from the Divizia C championship and bankruptcy. In the summer of 1995, the side was refounded with the same name of Aerostar Bacău and enrolled in the fourth division.

History

Aripile, first years and the ascension (1977–1992)
Founded in 1977 as Aripile Bacău (The Bacău Wings) the club was enrolled directly in the Divizia C, being assigned to the second series. The team obtained only a 14th place out of 16 in the first season and a 15th place at the end of the second, being relegated to the fourth tier of the Romanian football league system. After one season of absence Aripile promoted back to Divizia C and changed its name in Victoria IRA Bacău.

As Victoria IRA, the results started to appear: 1980–81 – 6th and 1981–82 – 5th. In the summer of 1982 the club ownership decided to change the team's name back to the old one, Aripile Bacău. A fantastic season followed, in which Aripile fought for promotion until the last rounds, finishing 2nd, at 5 points behind the local rival, Partizanul Bacău and two points over another team from Bacău County, Petrolul Moinești. In the next season "the Airmen" were even closer to the goal of promotion, being separated from the leader, Fepa 74 Bârlad, by only one point. Finally the yellow and blues promoted for the first time in the Divizia B at the end of the 1984–85 season, when they secured the first place in the detriment of Mecanica Vaslui, another team from Vaslui County, just like those from Fepa 74.

The first season in the Divizia B was ended with a well-deserved salvation from relegation after a tough battle with teams such as: Metalul Plopeni, Dunărea Călărași or Chimia Fălticeni. At the end of the season the club changed again its name, this time in Aripile Victoria Bacău, a mix between the two previous names: Aripile Bacău and Victoria IRA Bacău. The club relegated at the end of the season as the first one placed below the red line, at only one point from the first safe place, occupied by CS Botoșani. Back in the third tier, "the Airmen" turned out to be a very good team, finishing with nine points over the same Mecanica Vaslui, team that also lost the promotion battle in front of Aripile, back in 1985.

In the summer of 1988, with the occasion of promotion, Aripile Victoria became again just Aripile and finished on the 13th place, at only one point from the relegation zone where were the old rivals from Metalul Plopeni and Fepa 74. The next season, 1989–90 was the best in the history of the club which achieved an unexpected 8th place, being situated over teams such as: Foresta Fălticeni, Poiana Câmpina or Ceahlăul Piatra Neamț, among others. After the Romanian Revolution of 1990 the aeronautical company and implicitly the team have been affected by disorganization from the leadership of public institutions and followed two disappointing rankings: 1990–91 – 13th and 1991–92 – 16th, the last result meaning also the relegation to the third league.

Aerostar, a classic of Liga III (1992–present)
A notable event occurred in the summer of 1992, when the club changed its name in Aerostar Bacău, change that was in fact a normal move, after the parent company also changed its name in Aerostar SA. At the end of the 1992–93 season the yellow and blues finished only 4th, after Constructorul Iași, Mureșul Toplița and Harghita Odorheiu Secuiesc and nothing announced at the time the disaster that will destroy the club during the 1993–94 season, when due to financial problems the club was excluded from Divizia C, being subsequently dissolved. After one year of inactivity the club was refounded with the same name of Aerostar Bacău, in the summer of 1995. "The Airmen" were enrolled in the Divizia D, having in the lead also a new president, in the person of Doru Damaschin. But the return of Aerostar in the national football was difficult compared to other clubs, after five tough years spent at the county level, the team from Bacău promoted back to Divizia C at the end of the 1998–99 season.

Returned to the third tier, Aerostar never relegated again, but also has failed to promote in the second league for the next 18 years. In this period the club obtained better or less good results: 2nd (2007–08), 3rd (1999–2000, 2003–04, 2004–05), 4th (2005–06, 2014–15, 2016–17), 5th (2006–07), 6th (2011–12), 7th (2001–02, 2008–09, 2015–16), 9th (2000–01, 2002–03, 2012–13), 10th (2010–11), 11th (2013–14) and 12th (2009–10).

In the summer of 2017 due to the lack of strong football clubs in the city fact owed to the dissolution of the most important club, FCM Bacău, in the summer of 2014, the relegation of SC Bacău at the end of the 2016–17 season and also to the disappearance of other clubs such as Letea, Pambac or Willy, Aerostar has also received financial support from the Municipality of Bacău in order to reach the promotion to the second tier. Cristian Popovici was chosen to be the new manager of the team and important players such as: Ionuț Mihălăchioaie and Cătălin Vraciu signed contracts with "the Airmen". The promotion battle was a very tough one and went to the last rounds when Aerostar won 1–0 against Oțelul Galați and assured its promotion in front of "the Steelworkers" and in front of FK Miercurea Ciuc. Therefore, Aerostar promoted back to Liga II after 26 years of absence and 18 years after its return in the Liga III, in 1999. This promotion came as a mouth of oxygen for the football from Bacău and Bacău County at a time when Aerostar has come to be the only team that represent the city and the county in the first three leagues and at a time when the Municipal Stadium has become a ruin.

Honours
Liga III
Winners (4): 1984–85, 1987–88, 2017–18, 2019–20
Runners-up (3): 1982–83, 1983–84, 2007–08
Liga IV – Bacău County
Winners (3): 1976–77, 1979–80, 1998–99

Players

First team squad

Out on loan

Club officials

Board of directors

Current technical staff

League history

Notable former players

  Gheorghe Poenaru

Notable former managers

  Costel Câmpeanu
  Gheorghe Poenaru

References

External links
Official website

 
Football clubs in Bacău County
Sport in Bacău
Association football clubs established in 1977
Liga II clubs
Liga III clubs
Liga IV clubs
1977 establishments in Romania